Mountain Meadow may refer to:

Places 
 Mountain Meadow Preserve, in Massachusetts and Vermont 
 Mountain Meadow Ranch, in Susanville, California
 Mountain Meadow Lake, in Northern California
 Mountain Meadow, Utah, region in Washington County, Utah
 Mountain Meadow Farm, historical farm in Chester County, Pennsylvania

Other 
 Mountain Meadow, US title of John Buchan's 1941 novel Sick Heart River

See also
 Montane ecosystem
 Mountain Meadows (disambiguation)
 The Meadows (disambiguation)
 Meadow (disambiguation)